Ryan Anthony Stevenson (born 2 April 1992) is an English former cricketer who played as a right-handed fast-medium bowler and right handed batsman.

Stevenson spent some of his early career playing minor counties cricket for Devon. In the summer of 2015 Stevenson was working on his father's farm setting up his own campsite business while playing for Devon and Torquay Cricket Club when he was spotted by Hampshire director of cricket Giles White who offered him a trial at Hampshire to play 2nd XI cricket. He made his Hampshire debut in an LV County Championship match against Durham at the Riverside Ground on 1 September 2015.

Stevenson announced his retirement from professional cricket on 8 October 2021.

References

External links

1992 births
Living people
Sportspeople from Torquay
English cricketers
Devon cricketers
Hampshire cricketers